Oleydong Sithsamerchai  (Thai: โอเล่ห์ดง ศักดิ์เสมอชัย; born July 17, 1985, in Tambon Ratsada, Huai Yot District  (currently: Ratsada District), Trang Province) is a professional boxer from Thailand. He fights in the strawweight and super flyweight divisions and is the former WBC strawweight World champion. He captured the title on November 29, 2007, by defeating Eagle Den Janlaphan.

He is the first Thai world champion from southern Thailand. Because before that, many Thai boxers from southern Thailand challenged world champion, but without success.

Sithsamerchai won his third title defense on November 28, 2009, by a majority decision over Juan Palacios. He lost the WBC strawweight title on February 11, 2011, to Kazuto Ioka by KO.

Other names
Oleydong Kratingdaenggym (โอเล่ห์ดง กระทิงแดงยิม)
Oleydong CP Freshmart (โอเล่ห์ดง ซีพีเฟรชมาร์ท)

Professional boxing record

See also
 List of WBC world champions

References

External links 
 

1985 births
Living people
World Boxing Council champions
Mini-flyweight boxers
World mini-flyweight boxing champions
Oleydong Sithsamerchai
Oleydong Sithsamerchai